Julius Meinl International, also known simply as Julius Meinl, is a manufacturer and retailer of coffee, gourmet foods and other grocery products. The company is based in Vienna, Austria. It is named after its founders Julius Meinl I and Julius Meinl II.

History 
Julius Meinl I was the founder of a new category, selling ready roasted coffee for the first time in 1862.

Julius Meinl III ceded control of the company to his son in 1987. The retail division of the group, except the high-profile flagship store in downtown Vienna, was sold to Rewe by Julius Meinl V in 1998–1999.

Later the company's name was changed to Ragusa Beteiligungen, and the company was delisted from the Vienna Stock Exchange in February 2007.

Today Julius Meinl is a leading coffee company in Austria, Central and Eastern Europe and selling coffees and teas in more than 70 countries.  The leitmotif of the company is “How may I serve you?” to this day and 5th generation family members are still actively working in the business.

Its “Pay with a Poem” campaign has been running since 2014, inspiring people worldwide to pay for their coffee or tea worldwide with a poem.

Julius Meinl operates two coffee shops in the U.S., both on the North Side of Chicago, Illinois, and one in Australia.

Christina Meinl was appointed President of the Global Specialty Coffee Association in February 2020. Meinl aims to boost the sustainable specialty coffee agenda, expand the SCA's global network supporting local communities, and increase diversity within the organisation.

Logo 

The first logo of the company was designed in 1924 by Joseph Binder, a Viennese graphic designer. The logo depicted a dark-skinned boy with a red fez on his head, as a hint to the origin of the coffee. The design has changed significantly over the years, but the silhouette of a boy has remained its core part.

In 2004, Italian designer Matteo Thun has performed a redesign of the logo, making him look upright and using a single colour for the whole logo, effectively eliminating the boy's dark skin colour.

In 2007, an initiative called Mein Julius (English: "My Julius") started using the original version of the logo to protest against racist stereotypes and misinterpretations of Africa and the colonial period. This initiative has not indicated that they used the pre-redesign version of the logo, which led to criticism of the initiative itself.

External links 

USA website

References

Coffee companies of Austria
Food and drink companies based in Vienna
Food and drink companies established in 1862
Retail companies established in 1862
Food and drink companies of Austria
1862 establishments in the Austrian Empire
Austrian brands